German submarine U-240 was a Type VIIC U-boat of Nazi Germany's Kriegsmarine during World War II. The submarine was laid down on 14 May 1942 at the Friedrich Krupp Germaniawerft yard at Kiel as yard number 670, launched on 18 February 1943 and commissioned on 3 April 1943 under the command of Oberleutnant zur See Günther Link.

Design
German Type VIIC submarines were preceded by the shorter Type VIIB submarines. U-240 had a displacement of  when at the surface and  while submerged. She had two shafts and two  propellers.

U-240 was fitted with five  torpedo tubes (four fitted at the bow and one at the stern), fourteen torpedoes, one  SK C/35 naval gun, 220 rounds, and two twin  C/30 anti-aircraft guns. The boat had a complement of between forty-four and sixty.

Service history
After training with the 5th U-boat Flotilla at Kiel, U-240 was transferred to the 9th U-boat Flotilla for front-line service on 1 February 1944.

She sailed from Kiel to Kristiansand in Norway, on 27 to 28 March 1944, departing from there on her first combat patrol on 13 May.

The U-boat was listed as missing in the North Sea west of Norway from 15 May 1944. No definite explanation exists for her loss, but Sunderland JM667/V of No. 330 Norwegian Squadron (RAF Coastal Command) attacked and sank an unidentified U-boat in that area on 16 May. This is believed to be the U-240.

Previously recorded fate
U-240 was originally thought to have been sunk west of Norway by depth charges dropped by a Norwegian Short Sunderland flying boat of No. 330 Squadron RAF. The attack was against . No damage was caused.

References

Bibliography

External links

World War II submarines of Germany
German Type VIIC submarines
U-boats commissioned in 1943
Missing U-boats of World War II
1943 ships
Ships built in Kiel
U-boats sunk by unknown causes
Maritime incidents in May 1944